The Papuan frogmouth (Podargus papuensis) is a species of bird in the family Podargidae.

Taxonomy
The species was originally described by zoologist Jean René Constant Quoy and naturalist Joseph Paul Gaimard in 1830.

The three subspecies are P. p. papuensis, P. p. baileyi, and P. p. rogersi.

Description

The Papuan frogmouth is the largest of frogmouths in terms of length. Average sizes indicate that it only falls behind the Neotropical great potoo and oilbird (if the latter is a true member of the order) among the largest species in the order Caprimulgiformes. The tawny frogmouth is smaller on average than this but is capable of reaching higher maximum weights. The Papuan frogmouth has a bulbous bill, red eye, cream eyebrow, long tail and dark wings. The male of the species is slightly larger, darker and marbled in appearance. The female is more rufous in appearance.

P. p. baileyi is smaller, and darker.  P. p. rogersi is larger and paler.

Similar species include the tawny frogmouth. The Papuan frogmouth is larger, has red eyes, a longer tail, and darker wings.

Distribution and habitat
It is found in the Aru Islands, New Guinea, and Cape York Peninsula.

This species' natural habitat is subtropical or tropical, moist, lowland forests.

Behaviour

Call
The call is a resonant 'ooom' or a laughing hoot. It is usually heard after dusk and before dawn.

Breeding
Breeding takes place from August to January. One or two white eggs are placed in a nest consisting of a few sticks placed in the fork of a branch.

Feeding
The Papuan frogmouth is strictly nocturnal. It hunts for large insects on the ground from dusk. On occasion, it also takes small reptiles, amphibians, or birds as prey.

The Papuan frogmouth may secrete a substance in its mouth that attracts flies. According to a number of observers, it is able to wait with its mouth open and flies enter to investigate the odor.

References

External links

Papuan frogmouth
Birds of New Guinea
Birds of Cape York Peninsula
Papuan frogmouth
Taxonomy articles created by Polbot
Taxa named by Jean René Constant Quoy
Taxa named by Joseph Paul Gaimard